The Newport Beach Wooden Boat Festival is an annual event held at the Balboa Yacht Club in Newport Beach, California. The festival celebrates wooden boats of all sizes including wooden canoes, kayaks, and dinghies, as well as yachts and tall ships.

The first Newport Beach Wooden Boat Festival was held June 6, 2014 and featured 47 boats on display.

The COVID-19 pandemic caused officials to scrap the 7th annual festival in 2020 & defer it to 2021.

Awards
Awards are given in the following categories:

 Best–in-class power: over 50 feet and under 50 feet
 Best–in-class sail: over 50 feet and under 50 feet
 Human-powered wooden vessels

2015 events

The 2015 Newport Beach Wooden Boat Festival was held on June 6, 2015, in conjunction with the 40th anniversary of the Newport Beach Harbor Patrol. The yacht America, for which the America's Cup is named, was on display at the event.

2014 Winners
Sail:
 Over 50 feet: Zapata II
 Under 50 feet: RHODES 33 "Madness"

References

Further reading

Festivals in California
Boat shows in the United States
Recurring events established in 2014
2014 establishments in California
Newport Beach, California
Boat festivals